Luis Puelles Pàmies (1877 – Unknown) was a Spanish footballer who played as a defender for FC Barcelona. He played an important role in the conquest of Barça's first official titles, the 1901–02 Copa Macaya, which was the club's first-ever piece of silverware, and the 1902–03 Copa Barcelona.

Biography
Puelles was introduced to football during his time as a student in Marsella, playing football in there. He then played for FC Barcelona between 1900 and 1903, where he combined the positions of goalkeeper and defender, and won a Copa Macaya in 1901–02, the club's first-ever piece of silverware, and a Copa Barcelona in 1902–03.

Together with Joan Gamper, John Parsons, the Morris brothers (Samuel, Enrique and Miguel), and Udo Steinberg, Puelles was part of the Barça team that participated in the 1902 Copa de la Coronación, the first national championship disputed in Spain and the forerunner for the Copa del Rey. He featured in the final against Club Bizcaya (a combination of players from Athletic Club and Bilbao Football Club), which Barça lost 2–1.

He was also an outstanding Basque ball player.

Honours
FC Barcelona
Copa Macaya:
Winners (1): 1901–02

 Copa Barcelona:
 Winners (1): 1902–03

References

1877 births
Year of death missing
Footballers from Barcelona
Spanish footballers
Association football defenders
FC Barcelona players